Bianco, rosso e Verdone is a 1981 Italian comedy film directed and starred by Carlo Verdone, playing three characters.

It was produced by Sergio Leone, soundtrack composed by Ennio Morricone and guest starred by Mario Brega, all formerly scored in the Dollars trilogy and Spaghetti Western movies in the 1960s.

Cast
 Carlo Verdone as Furio, Mimmo and Pasquale Amitrano
 Irina Sanpiter (dubbed by Solvejg D'Assunta) as Magda, Furio's wife
 Elena Fabrizi as Mimmo's grandmother
 Milena Vukotic as a call-girl
 Mario Brega as "The Prince" truck driver
 Angelo Infanti as Raul the seducer
 Andrea Aureli as Mimmo's Uncle
 Elisabeth Wiener as Pasquale's German wife
 Anna Alessandra Ariorio
 Vittorio Zarfati as the motel doorkeeper
 Giovanni Brusadori
 Guido Monti
 Giuseppe Pezzulli

Plot
Italian election day in the early '80s. Three men leave to reach their respective voting places. Furio, a pedantic and chatterbox clerk living in Turin, is leaving with his family on his way to Rome. The same goes for are half-witted Mimmo and his diabetic grandmother, whom he will have to care for during the travel. Meanwhile, Pasquale, an Italian immigrant in Germany, almost mute and married to a local  valkyrie-like  woman, leaves alone on his Alfasud car directed to Matera, southern Italy.
Theirs is an eventful journey through Italian motorways. Furio's wife Magda is on the edge of a nervous breakdown because of her husband, whose perfectionism forces the entire family into a life where every step is overly planned and detailed. Mimmo is continuously mocked by his disabled but cunning grandmother. Pasquale, oblivious to the hardships of the world, keeps being targeted by thieves at every stop he takes.
Magda, Mimmo and their relatives spend a night in the same motel, while Furio stays at hospital because of a car crash. The woman is courted by Raul, a handsome man that had been following them since the earlier hours of their travel. Mimmo is taken by a call-girl who works in the motel. He is so naive and gullible to misunderstand the nature of her job, mistakes her pubic hair for a "fur underwear", and completely misunderstands her intentions. Pasquale's car is eventually stripped bare and left without seats, windscreen and decorative wheel rims. Saddened but determined, he continues his journey.
The three men eventually get to their polling stations. Magda escapes with Raul while Furio is voting. Mimmo's grandma, eager to vote for the Italian Communist Party, dies in the voting cabin, with the scrutinizers arguing about the validity of her vote while Mimmo cries. Pasquale, fed up with his misadventures that started at the very moment he returned to his country, for the first time in the movie voices his anger with an unintelligible rant, retelling his misfortunes and hardships and protesting the uselessness of his vote. Finally, with only his last few words being understandable by the audience, tells the scrutinizers (and, more broadly, Italy as a whole) to "screw themselves", bids farewell, and leaves for Germany.

Comment
Verdone's second movie, coming through his successful Fun is beautiful (Un sacco bello). He uses the same formula of the first work, as director and multi-role starring. The election day as background to mock the miseries and hardships of Italian society, especially in the emigrant's misfortunes. The producer Sergio Leone was formerly afraid the character Furio would result hateful to viewers, so he was of an old aged and actual diabetic Lella Fabrizi's performance. He's latter agreed with Verdone's choices. The obsessive, pedantic Furio character often falls in Verdone's works, telling to be inspired by one's of his relatives. Russian actress Irina Sanpiter was chosen because of her big blue eyes and angelical, pale face. Pasquale's dated character stereotypes the helpless Italian emigrant, emphasized by his untidy and old fashioned wear, garish car decoration, listening of Italian '50s music.

Notes

External links
 

1980s Italian-language films
Commedia all'italiana
1981 films
1981 comedy films
Films directed by Carlo Verdone
Films scored by Ennio Morricone
Sergio Leone
1980s Italian films